Brian Thomson may refer to:

 Brian Thomson (scenic designer), Australian theatre, opera and film designer
 Brian Thomson (journalist) (born 1965), Scottish-born Australian journalist
 Brian Thomson (sport shooter) (born 1957), Olympic sport shooter for New Zealand
 Brian Harold Thomson (1918–2006), newspaper proprietor of D. C. Thomson & Co.
 Brian Thomson (footballer) (born 1959), Scottish footballer

See also 
 Brian Thomsen (1959–2008), science fiction editor, author, and anthologist
 Brian Thompson (disambiguation)